Acacia areolata is a shrub belonging to the genus Acacia and the subgenus Juliflorae that is endemic to north western Australia.

Description
It has grey-brown coloured bark and has a fissured texture and resinous and glabrous new shoots with a rusty-brown colour. The mildly flattened and glabrous branchlets have a grey or reddish colour and are often covered in a fine white powdery coating. Like many species of Acacia it has phyllodes rather than true leaves. The green phyllodes are also often covered in a white powdery coating and have a straight and dimidiately elliptic shape that are sometimes straight and symmetrically broad-elliptic. It blooms in September producing yellow flowers.

Distribution
It is native to an area of the Kimberley region of Western Australia. The range of the shrub extends from around Cape Londonderry in the north down to around the Carson Escarpment in the south in the northern Kimberley. It usually grows in lateritic based or sandstone based soils as a part of open woodland communities.

See also
List of Acacia species

References

areolata
Acacias of Western Australia
Plants described in 2003